Danu is an ancient Scythian word meaning "river". The commonly proposed etymology of the names of the Danube River, Dnieper River, Dniester River, Don River, and Donets River.

Danu may also refer to:

Mythology
 Danu (Indo European) a water goddess in the Indo-European religion
 Danu (Irish goddess), reconstructed mother goddess of the Tuatha De Danann (Old Irish: "The peoples of the goddess Danu")
 Danu (Asura), an Asura and Hindu primordial goddess of primeval waters
 Dewi Danu, a Balinese Hindu water goddess

People
 Danu people, an ethnic group in Myanmar

Places

Iran

Moldova
 Danu, Glodeni, a commune in Glodeni district, Moldova

Myanmar
 Danu language, a Burmish language in Myanmar

Popular culture
 Danú, an Irish folk music group
 The fictitious island setting of Timothy Mo's novel, The Redundancy of Courage based on the real-life nation of East Timor

Acronym DANU
 Doclean Academy of Sciences and Arts, with the native acronym DANU